Jean-Joseph, marquis de Laborde (29 January 1724 – 18 April 1794) was a French businessman, fermier général and banker to the king, who turned politician.  A liberal, he was guillotined in the French Revolution.

Biography
Laborde was born near Jaca in Aragon, into a modest béarnaise family. When he reached adolescence he joined his uncle, who was head of a maritime import–export company at Saint-Jean-de-Luz, and took over as head of the business on the cousin's death. He based his subsequent fortune not only on this company, but also on transatlantic trade (supplying the American colonies with basics, in return for far more financially interesting products such as tropical fruits, rare trees and enslaved people) and his sugar plantations on Saint-Domingue (Haïti). He shipped nearly 10,000 people to the French colony of Saint-Domingue on his slave ships and enslaved 2,000 on the plantations he owned there.

His rapid rise, comparable to that of several bourgeois men of the Age of Enlightenment, gained him promotion to noble rank and allowed him to acquire several estates. He became fermier général (1759–1767) on the suggestion of his friend the duc de Choiseul. He took up residence in the château de La Ferté-Vidame in 1764, the fief bringing with it the ancient title of Vidame de Chartres.  He rebuilt it in the neoclassical style which now remains as a shell, and commissioned several artists. However, following a game of musical chairs, he lost it in 1784 to the duc de Penthièvre, who had himself lost his domaine de Rambouillet to king Louis XV, who coveted its "terres giboyeuses" or wooded hunting lands. Laborde was named marquis and in 1784 acquired the Château de Méréville, rebuilding it to his taste.

In politics, he was ahead of his time and of the French Revolution, and (with Mirabeau) was one of the few noble députés (from the bailliage d'Étampes) to accept demotion to the Third Estate upon the Revolution. However, this was not enough to save him from being guillotined in Paris under the "loi des suspects" on the orders of Louis de Saint-Just, in one of the last fits of the Reign of Terror in May 1794. In 1792, much of the fabulous Orleans Collection of paintings was briefly his, before he was forced by events to abandon his ambition to exhibit them in his Paris house, and sold them.

Descendants
Edouard-Jean-Joseph de Laborde Marchainville (1762–1786), a member of the Lapérouse expedition, who drowned, along with his brother, in Lituya Bay, Alaska 
Pauline de Laborde (1765–1782), married Jean-François Pérusse, 1st duc des Cars
Ange-Auguste-Joseph de Laborde Boutervilliers (1766-1786), a member of the Lapérouse expedition, who drowned, along with his brother, in Lituya Bay, Alaska
Nathalie de Laborde (1774–1835), married Charles de Noailles, duc de Mouchy, was la petite mouche among the many mistresses of Chateaubriand
Alexandre de Laborde, archaeologist, soldier and politician, who continued his father's Revolutionary political views

Notes

Sources

Further reading
"Hubert Robert at Méréville", in Consumption Of Culture, eds. Ann Bermingham, John Brewer, 2013, Routledge, 9781134808403, google books

External links
His genealogy on Geneanet

1724 births
1794 deaths
People from Jaca
18th-century French politicians
French people executed by guillotine during the French Revolution
Fermiers généraux
Executed Spanish people
People of Saint-Domingue
Landscape architects
French slave traders
French slave owners